Josip Bilaver (born 14 August 1984) is a Croatian retired footballer who spent his entire career at hometown club Zadar.

In 2020, he was appointed coach of NK Zadarnova.

References

External links

1984 births
Living people
Sportspeople from Zadar
Association football wingers
Association football fullbacks
Croatian footballers
Croatia under-21 international footballers
NK Zadar players
Croatian Football League players